Aimée du Buc de Rivéry (4 December 1768 – 1???) was a French heiress who went missing at sea as a young woman. There is a legend that she was captured by Barbary pirates, sold as a harem concubine, and was the same person as Nakşîdil Sultan, a Valide sultan (Queen Mother) of the Ottoman Empire; this has not been proven.

Life
Aimée was born 4 December 1768, the daughter of wealthy French plantation owner Henri du Buc de Rivéry (1748 - 1808) and Marie Anne Arbousset-Beaufond (1739 - 1811) in Pointe Royale, south-west of Robert on the Caribbean island of Martinique. She was a distant cousin-in-law, of Empress Josephine, via Josephine's first marriage with Alexandre de Beauharnais, who had been executed during the Reign of Terror.

Having been sent to a convent school in France, she was returning home, in July or August 1788, when the ship on which she traveled vanished at sea.

It was popularly theorized that the ship was attacked and taken by Barbary pirates. It has been further suggested that she fell victim to the Barbary slave trade, and eventually sent to Constantinople as a gift to the Ottoman Sultan by the Bey of Algiers.

Legend about her being Valide Sultan Nakşidil
According to the legend, Aimée becomes the wife of the Sultan (historically: Abdul Hamid I), taking the name of Nakşidil. She supposedly teaches the Sultan French and introduces French ideas to him, and so to the Ottoman people. For the first time, a permanent ambassador is sent from Constantinople to Paris. The legend credits her with influencing the Sultan to make French-style reforms which then lead to his death at the hands of the Janissaries and the Ulema, since both groups oppose liberalization of the empire. After his death, Nakşidil continues to hold influence over Mahmud II, either as his biological or as his foster mother, having had a hand in his education. When Mahmud II succeeds Abdul Hamid as Sultan, he starts a French newspaper and allows Nakşidil to decorate the Topkapı Palace in rococo style, which is popular in France at that time.

Several retellings of the legend claim that she even exerted influence in foreign policy, and that the Ottoman ruler's attitude towards the French deteriorated as a consequence of Napoléon's divorce of Aimée's cousin-in-law, Joséphine Bonaparte, in order to marry Marie Louise. This was taken to explain the Ottomans conceding in their war with Russia (to enable their resistance against Napoléon) as well as the Ottomans siding with England over France during the Napoleonic Wars.

The legend of Aimée as Nakşidil ends with claiming that she accepted Islam as part of the harem etiquette, since it was the religion of her husband, yet always remained a Roman Catholic in her heart. Supposedly, her last wish was for a Christian priest to perform the last rites. Her son, Mahmud II, did not deny her this: as Aimée lay dying, a priest passed for the first time through the Seraglio, to perform the Holy Sacrament before her death. Her tomb lies not far from the Hagia Sophia.

Controversy over the legend

Some researchers have looked into the alleged history of Aimée du Buc de Rivéry in the royal harem and found it implausible.

According to Turkish historian Necdet Sakaoğlu, Nakşîdil Sultan was ethnically Georgian in origin.

While several stories claimed that Aimée was abducted in 1781 - early enough that the seventeen year old could have been the mother of Mahmud II, born in 1785 - other stories took into account that Aimée was well in France with her family until the year 1788 at least. In the latter recounts of the tale, Aimée is only the foster mother to Mahmud II, while his birth mother died in his childhood.

None of those accounts however are considering a contemporary source from the year 1817: Nakşidil was reportedly abducted when she was still two years old. That version of her story, if true, would make it impossible for her to be identical with the missing Aimée.

Robert Vine wrote: "The myth of two cousins from a Caribbean island becoming respectively the wife of the French Emperor and the mother of the Ottoman Sultan has an obvious romantic attraction - but by the same token, is highly improbable, unless provided with solid factual proof".

There are however indications that seeds of the legend have been carefully planted. Several older myths, dating back even to the early 16th century, already purported connections between the French and the Ottoman monarchy. These have been traced to be politically motivated fabrications, so that alliances between the respective monarchs were seen as justifiable. The Aimée-Nakşidil tale distinctly parallels these older tales. In times of monarchy, the stories about abducted French princesses weren't repudiated to maintain good relations - in fact, both Napoleon III and Abdülaziz were pleased to announce their kinship to each other, years later. In later times this and similar harem tales have been used to perpetuate the prejudice of Turkey, the Middle East and the Islam in general as mysterious and despotic in nature, despite more accurate accounts available. The legend furthermore reinforced prejudices of the Ottoman Empire as a backwater country, where even a western slave consort was able to initiate an overdue modernization while the primitive natives couldn't conceive necessary reforms.

Popular fiction and uncritical recounts
"The Veiled Empress: An Unacademic Biography" by Benjamin A. Morton. (G.P. Putnam's Sons, 1923)
"Seven League Boots" by Richard Halliburton (Lowe and Brydone, 1936); Halliburton recounts a fairly complete version of the legend as fact in chapter XX.
"The Wilder Shores of Love" by Lesley Blanch, London: Phoenix Press and New York: Simon & Schuster, 1954
"The Veiled Sultan" by March Cost (pen name of Margaret Mackie Morrison) (NY: Vanguard Press, 1969)
"A Distant Shore" by Susannah James (Signet, 1981),  
"Sultana" by Prince Michael of Greece (NY: Harper & Row, 1983), 
"Valide" by Barbara Chase-Riboud, 1986
 Aimée's story, further fictionalized, was told in the 1989 movie Intimate Power (a.k.a. The Favorite), in which she was portrayed by Amber O'Shea, and which also starred F. Murray Abraham. It was based on the novel "Sultana" by Prince Michael of Greece.
"The Palace of Tears" by Alev Lytle Croutier (Delecorte Press, 2000)
"Seraglio" by Janet Wallach (NY: Nan A. Talese, 2003),  (0-385-49046-1)
"The Janissary Tree" by Jason Goodwin (NY: Farrar, Straus and Giroux div. of Macmillan, 2006), /978-0374178604; not just about her, but she is a major character in this and four subsequent novels in the Yashim investigator series.
"Si la Martinique m'était contée à travers l'histoire des chevaliers du Buc de la Normandie à la Martinique... en passant par la Turquie" by Y.B. du Buc de Mannetot, member of the family Du Buc (NY: du Buc, histoire coloniale et patrimoine antillais, 2008)
"The French Odalisque" by Sean Graham (London: Orbach and Chambers, 2009)  
 "The Stolen Girl" and "The French Sultana" by Zia Wesley (ePublishing Works!, 2014)

Further reading
 Maurizio Costanza, La Mezzaluna sul filo - La riforma ottomana di Mahmûd II, Marcianum Press, Venezia, 2010 (appendix.1)

See also
List of people who disappeared mysteriously at sea

References

External links
La légende de la sultane Validé

1768 births
1780s missing person cases
18th-century French people
18th-century French women
19th-century French people
Date of death unknown
People from Le Robert
People lost at sea
Year of death unknown